Bannerghatta Road ( ಬನ್ನೇರುಘಟ್ಟ ರಸ್ತೆ, commonly known as BG Road) is an Indian State Highway in Karnataka. It connects Bangalore with the towns of Bannerghatta, Jigani, and Anekal. It starts as a branch from Hosur Road near the Adugodi Christian Cemetery and ends at Anekal.

History 
In 2011, the Bruhat Bangalore Mahanagara Palike announced that the road would be widened in several places while underpasses and flyovers would be built at major junctions.

The Government of Karnataka cleared the second phase of Namma Metro, which proposes a third line from Gottigere to Nagavara via the Indian Institute of Management Bangalore (IIM-B). The project was designed to significantly reduce the traffic load on Bannerghatta Road.

Main junctions
The main junctions and traffic hotspots are at Adugodi, Dairy Circle, Sagar Hospital, Gurappanapalya, Sri Jayadeva Institute of Cardiology, N. S. Palya, Bilekahalli, Arekere Gate, Hulimavu Gate, Gottigere, Bannerghatta Circle, Koppa Gate, and Jigani industrial area. The NICE BMIC peripheral ring road intersects with State Highway 87 south of Gottigere. For approximately five kilometers south of Jayadeva underpass, South Avenue, Bannerghatta Road was widened to four lanes by Mantri Developers in one of the city's first private-public partnerships. The Dairy Circle and the Jayadeva grade separators are on this road. Bannerghatta Road has intersections with major roads such as Hosur Road, Outer Ring Road, and NICE Road.

Religious places
 Sri Sri Meenakshi Sundareshwara Temple
 Santhome Parish Church
 Bilal Masjid

Educational institutions

The Indian Institute of Management Bangalore is located between Bilekahalli and Arekere. Christ University Central Campus is located close to Dairy Circle and the Christ University Banngerghatta Road Campus is located at Hulimavu. Located near the south end of B. G. road is Padma Seshadri Bala Bhavan. Sherwood High is located near the NICE road intersection. Further away AMC Institutions, an all boys boarding school, Sarala Birla Academy, is located on BG road, close to the Bannerghatta National Park.

Hospitals
Several major hospitals are located on this road:

Sri Jayadeva Institute of Cardiology
Apollo Hospitals near Arekere junction
Fortis Healthcare (previously known as Wockhardt Hospital) near Arekere Junction
Narayana Health
Vijayashree Hospitals

Malls
Malls on Bannerghatta Road include:

 Gopalan Innovation Mall, 22, Sarakki Industrial Layout, J.P. Nagar 3rd Phase
 Shoppers Stop, N S Palya, B.T.M. Layout 2nd Stage
 Vega City Mall, 172/1, Srinivas Industrial Estate, J.P. Nagar 3rd Phase
 Royal Meenakshi Mall, Cave Temple Road, Hulimavu

Residential Layouts

 CP Ecofront Layout, Near Kumbaranhalli

References

	

Roads in Bangalore Urban district
Roads in Bangalore